Stephen Atkinson may refer to:

 Steve Atkinson (1948–2003),  Canadian ice hockey player 
 Steve Atkinson (cricketer) (born 1952), English-born cricketer
 Stephen Atkinson (metallurgist) (fl. 1586–1619), English metallurgist
 Steven Atkinson (born 1984), British director and producer